Sobre la conveniencia de un Congreso General Americano is an 1844 book by Juan Bautista Alberdi. The book proposed Pan-Americanism based on a joint work in national customs.

Bibliography
 

Books by Juan Bautista Alberdi
Pan-Americanism
1844 books